Dosar is a 2006 Bengali language Indian drama film. It was produced by Arindam Chaudhuri (Planman Motion Pictures) and directed by Rituparno Ghosh, the black-and-white film won the National Film Award – Special Jury Award / Special Mention (Feature Film) for the lead role portrayal by Prosenjit Chatterjee. The movie additionally stars Konkona Sen Sharma, who for her part won the Best Actress Award at the New York Film Festival in 2007. The film was premiered in the 60th 2007 Cannes Film Festival in the Les Cinema Du Monde section. The film was a sleeper hit at the box office.

Synopsis 
The story revolves around Kaushik (Prosenjit Chatterjee) and Kaberi (Konkona Sen Sharma), a happy couple until a car accident takes away Mita, Kaushik's mistress, and leaves Kaushik injured and grieving. Mita, the mother of a little boy and living with her husband, was Kaushik's colleague. This revelation leaves Kaberi shattered. Kaushik successfully moves on with life leaving Mita behind and tries his best to repair the severely wounded relationship with his wife. Another couple in the film, Brinda (Pallavi Chatterjee) and Bobby (Parambrata Chatterjee), are also engaged in an extramarital relation. While Bobby is a bachelor, Brinda, quite older than Bobby, is unhappily married. They and Kaberi do group theatre together. Brinda-Bobby comes to a crossroads when Brinda becomes pregnant and Bobby is not sure whether the child is his or her husband's. However, he does not turn back and stands by Brinda in sorting out her issues.

Kaberi often threatens divorce but ultimately is overpowered by the wife in her and cannot resist fulfilling her duties towards her husband at the time of crisis. On the other hand, Kaushik is also caught in his own predicament. He has to not only come to terms with the loss of a loved one but is faced with the daunting task of winning back his wife's trust.

Cast 
Prosenjit Chatterjee as Kaushik Chatterjee
Konkona Sen Sharma as Kaberi Chatterjee
Chandrayee Ghosh as Mita Ray
Shankar Chakraborty as Mita Ray's husband
Pallavi Chatterjee as Brinda
Parambrata Chatterjee as Bobby
Saswata Chatterjee as Kaushik's younger brother
Tota Roy Chowdhury as Kaushik's colleague
Pushpita Mukherjee as Nurse Khusi

Awards
 2007 :Bengal Film Journalists' Association Awards: Best Actor Award for Prosenjit Chatterjee
 2007: Mahindra Indo-American Arts Council (MIAAC) Film Festival : Best Actress for Konkona Sen Sharma.
 2007, Mahindra Indo-American Arts Council (MIAAC) Film Festival : Best Director for Rituparno Ghosh.
 2007: National Film Award – Special Jury Award / Special Mention (Feature Film) for Prosenjit Chatterjee

References

Tidbits
Director Rituparno Ghosh says no connection should be made between the content and black-and-white theme. It was just his fascination to do a black-and-white film. In his own words at the inauguration of the Tel-Aviv Indian film festival in 2007: 
"Don't try to relate the subject to the chromatic value. Because I thought I want to do a black and white film and that is the ultimate logic. Because often we see as tech advances a newer format comes into being, the older format is thrown, banished from our life. It does not remain as a creative choice anymore....."

External links
Official Site

2006 films
2000s Bengali-language films
Bengali-language Indian films
Films set in Kolkata
Films based on works by Shirshendu Mukhopadhyay
Films directed by Rituparno Ghosh